Stanislava Tsekova (Bulgarian: Станислава Цекова) is a Bulgarian football midfielder, currently playing in the Bulgarian Championship for NSA Sofia, with whom she has also played the UEFA Women's Champions League. She is a member of the Bulgaria women's national football team.

References

1982 births
Living people
Bulgarian women's footballers
Bulgaria women's international footballers
Women's association football midfielders
FC NSA Sofia players
21st-century Bulgarian women